The 2014 Asian Women’s Club Volleyball Championship was the 15th staging of the AVC Club Championships. The tournament was held in Nakhon Pathom, Thailand.

Pools composition
The teams are seeded based on their final ranking at the 2013 Asian Women's Club Volleyball Championship.

* Withdrew

Preliminary round

Pool A

|}

|}

Pool B

|}

|}

Classification 9th–10th

|}

Final round

Quarterfinals

|}

5th–8th semifinals

|}

Semifinals

|}

7th place

|}

5th place

|}

3rd place

|}

Final

|}

Final standing

Awards
MVP:  Miyu Nagaoka (Hisamitsu)
Best Setter:  Chizuru Kotō (Hisamitsu)
Best Outside Spikers:  Yuki Ishii (Hisamitsu) and  Chen Liyi (Tianjin)
Best Middle Blockers:  Kanako Hirai (Hisamitsu) and  Lyudmila Anarbayeva (Zhetyssu)
Best Opposite Spiker:  Li Ying (Tianjin)
Best Libero:  Marina Storozhenko (Zhetyssu)

References

External links
Asian Volleyball Confederation

International volleyball competitions hosted by Thailand
A
V
Sport in Nakhon Pathom province